Satipo may refer to:

Geography
 Satipo (town)
 Satipo District
 Satipo Province
 Satipo Airport
 Satipo River, near Satipo Airport; tributary of Amazon River

Other
 Satipo (Indiana Jones), fictional character